The Projeto TAMAR (Portuguese for TAMAR Project, with TAMAR being an abbreviation of Tartarugas Marinhas, the Sea Turtles) is a Brazilian  non-profit organization owned by the Chico Mendes Institute for Biodiversity Conservation. The main objective of the project is to protect sea turtles from extinction in the Brazilian coastline.

History 
The TAMAR project was officially created in 1980. The first activities were not centered on the preservation of the turtles, but on the identification of them, their spawn sites and seasons, and the main problems caused by poaching. When the first preservation actions began, TAMAR took the first Brazilian pictures of a sea turtle spawning.

In 1983, the oceanographers searched for Petrobras, to ask for support on the project. The company analyzed all the actions of the project and decided to support it, by providing fuel to their jeeps.

By 2008, TAMAR managed to release more than 8 million turtles in the sea.

Objective 
Although the initial purpose was to protect sea turtles only, the project grew and became concerned with sharks and all the sea wildlife, as they are part of the environment in which the sea turtles live. All actions by the project intend to preserve wildlife, concern people about environment, and create sustainable places for the procreation of the species protected by TAMAR.

Bases 
There are currently 22 bases of the project, spread all over the country coastline, covering a range of more than 1000 kilometers.

Ceará
Almofala, 
Rio Grande do Norte
Atol das Rocas
Pipa
Pernambuco
Fernando de Noronha
Sergipe
Ponta dos Mangues – Pacatuba
Pirambu
Oceanário – Aracaju, 
Abais – Itaporanga d'Ajuda
Bahia
Ponta dos Mangues - Jandaíra
Sítio do Conde – Salvador
Costa do sauípe - Salvador
Praia do Forte – Salvador
Arembepe - Salvador
Espírito Santo
Itaúnas – Conceição da Barra, 
Guiriri – São Mateus
Pontal do Ipiranga/Povoação – Linhares
Regência - Linhares (Comboios Biological Reserve)
Trindade - Linhares
Anchieta
Rio de Janeiro
Bacia de Campos – Campos dos Goytacazes
São Paulo
Ubatuba
Santa Catarina
Florianópolis

References

External links 
  

Environmental organisations based in Brazil
Non-profit organisations based in Brazil
Organizations established in 1980
1980 establishments in Brazil